Cristina Bautista Taquinas (1977–2019) was a Colombian activist, community leader of the Paez/Nasa people of Colombia, and social worker. She dedicated her life to defending indigenous peoples' lands, and fighting for indigenous women's rights.

Early life 
Cristina Bautista Taquinas was born in 1977 la vereda La Capilla in Corinto, a small town in Colombia’s Cauca department. She was the oldest of five siblings, and her childhood consisted of taking care of her younger siblings from the time she was six years old. While her parents worked to financially support her family, as a child she would take her siblings to daycare before school, cook, and do the laundry for her family.

At age twelve, she left home to support her family financially and worked in various homes and fincas, cooking for the finca workers and doing their laundry.

At age thirteen, she went to work in the big city nearest her hometown, Cali. The woman she worked for in Cali encouraged her to attend high school there. She had never finished her elementary education since she begun working at a young age, but nevertheless she was accepted into a high school in Cali due to her good performance on an entrance exam, and she eventually graduated from high school in Cali.

Education 
She stayed in Cali and attended Universidad del Valle, first studying occupational therapy. She rented a small room and put herself through college by being a vendor in one of Cali’s soccer stadiums. She would sell orange juice made of oranges that her family would send her from their reservation of Tacueyo back home, and would also sell "cholado", a traditional treat from Cali.

She was a good student, but underwent some financial hardship when another vendor caused conflict, which resulted in her losing her vendor spot and income. Due to this, her grades suffered, and her family encouraged her to drop out of college and come home. But, she never gave up, and through financial struggles, she continued her schooling.

After a few semesters, she changed her focus of study to social work. As soon as she started in this new field, she absolutely loved every aspect of it. She loved studying community work, intervention against violence of women and children, social justice, human rights, and equality. She was passionate about these subjects as they related to her own Paez/Nasa community’s struggles of marginalization, and violence against indigenous women and people at large by the Colombian armed conflict that plagued her land by guerilla groups such as the FARC who often kidnapped and murdered people of her community.

In 2017, she was granted a scholarship in the Human Rights Training Program for Indigenous Peoples of Latin America.

In 2018, she graduated with her degree in Social Work from the School of Social Work and Human Development of Universidad del Valle.

Activism 
After her graduation in 2018, she returned home to the Paez/Nasa Tacueyo reservation in Toribio, Cauca and wanted to apply her social work studies in her community.

Her activism focused on violence against women, not only on her reservation but in her town and department at large, and united peers, friends, and any indigenous woman who wanted to participate to share their experiences.

She dreamed of women holding positions of leadership in the Paez/Nasa community, and wanted to fight for women’s rights and equality. She wanted Toribio to not only be the start of the women’s movement in Cauca, but in Colombia as a whole, and beyond.

Hilando Pensamiento 
She started her own movement, ”Hilando Pensamiento”, or “Weaving Thoughts”, in order to empower and encourage indigenous women. Her movement was focused on empowering women to dream, and her message was that indigenous women had the right to develop and grow and be in charge of making important decisions. She believed in equal pay in order to truly value a woman's work, who she believed worked double shifts, one during the day and then one at home caring for the family.

The women involved in the “Hilando Pensamiento” group were treated poorly in the community, particularly by the traditional male leaders who labeled them as subversive and disliked that women were forming a group, questioning the social norms and customs that had always been in place. While the group started off being disorganized, not having set meeting locations, they traveled El Valle telling all women about their capacity for autonomy and growth. Even though men and even some women rejected her ideas, with her open mind and grand vision, Cristina always believed in her cause in order to empower women, as well as to educate the new, forward thinking generations.

The "Hilando Pensamiento" Movement got accredited by the United Nations Permanent Forum on Indigenous Issues in 2019.

Leadership 
With her women empowerment movement, Cristina longed to become part of the Constituyente Nasa, the constituent assembly responsible for developing the constitution of the Paez/Nasa people. Her goal was to gain her own spot on the assembly to represent women with her movement and help make decisions in the community. She was rejected many times and was humiliated, but she continued attending assembly meetings until she gained a seat of her own in the assembly as an editor.

Her position on the Nasa Constituent Assembly made her very notable in her community, as people wanted her to run for governor. She intended to continue her studies to earn her Master’s,  but eventually accepted a position as Nasa governor.

As a social worker, founder of an accredited women’s movement, having a seat on her community’s constituent assembly and governor of the Paez/Nasa community, in early 2019 she traveled to the United Nations Permanent Forum on Indigenous Issues headquarters in New York to represent indigenous women. Her talk in this forum called attention to the hardships and violence indigenous peoples in Colombia were facing at the hands of FARC guerilla groups, as well as the inequalities and struggles women faced. At this event, she was internationally recognized as a representative of indigenous peoples.

Death 
As sovereign people, the Paez/Nasa have their own police-like Native Guard made up of volunteers that defend and protect their territories. Following tradition, they are unarmed as they carry traditional wooden sticks adorned with ribbons.

In August 2019, two Paez/Nasa Native Guards were killed. In response to this murder of her people as well as the murder of many others, Cristina spoke out against the violence that has plagued her community for years.

On October 29, 2019, some Paez/Nasa Native Guards were patrolling an area of the reservation, Vereda La Luz, when they were alerted to the presence of an unknown vehicle carrying kidnapped individuals. The guards blocked the vehicle on the road and called for backup. Four more guards, Cristina, and another female Nasa governor answered their plea for help, and when they arrived, started to help free the kidnapped people trapped in the vehicle. Yet, this incident proved to be an attack by the FARC guerilla, as the hidden attackers then rained gunfire and grenades on the helpers, killing Cristina as well as four Native Guards, and injuring five more.

Legacy 
Despite Cristina's death, her "Hilando Pensamientos" movement is still active, posting on their social media pages and organizing events. Her community still fights for peace in their land, and equality for all. Her death brought international attention to the Paez/Nasa’s cause, and has received attention and help from the Colombian government as well.

A mural in Cristina’s honor was added to Universidad del Valle where she graduated from.

References 

1977 births
2019 deaths
Colombian women activists
University of Valle alumni